Alberty is a surname. Notable people with the surname include:

Eliza Missouri Bushyhead Alberty (1839–1919), Cherokee businesswoman, school administrator, and educator
Robert A. Alberty (1921–2014), American chemist 
Karl-Otto Alberty (1933-2015), German actor
Vivián Alberty (born 1973), Puerto Rican diver

See also
Alberti (surname)